The Albion Greyhound Stadium was a greyhound racing stadium in Glasgow.

Origins
Albion in Glasgow opened on 21 April 1928 on the Broomloan Road  and was described as good size track with a circumference of 457 yards. The first hare installed was an outside running 'Metro-Vickers Mono-rail' and the distances were 300, 553, and 725 yards. Albion Stadium was built in close proximity to Ibrox Stadium which was on the north side and White City Stadium, Glasgow which opened the same year and was on the south-west side.

History

The principal event was the Ibrox & Albion Stakes and facilities included the Ibrox licensed Sports Club with membership subscription. Owned by the Albion Glasgow Racing Ltd the track was affiliated to the National Greyhound Racing Society and became a very
popular venue during the 1930s.

After the war the Glasgow City assessor increased the valuations of the five greyhound stadiums in Glasgow. This was opposed by the tracks because of the resulting tax charges. The assessor valued the stadium at £12,000 but the track management disagreed with their own valuation of £1,250.

The stadium closed on 23 June 1960. Part of the site, directly south of Edmiston Drive, was used to build the Broomloan Court tower block flats in 1965 and which were themselves demolished in the 2010s. During the latter 1960s and beyond the remaining grass area was used as a training ground by nearby Rangers Football Club. This area is now a large car park area used by Rangers F.C.

Track records

References

Defunct greyhound racing venues in the United Kingdom
Greyhound racing in Scotland
Sports venues in Glasgow
Sports venues completed in 1928
Govan
Sports venues demolished in 1962